The 1949 Western Kentucky Hilltoppers football team represented Western Kentucky State College (now known as Western Kentucky University) as a member of the Ohio Valley Conference (OVC) during the 1949 college football season. Led by second-year head coach Jack Clayton, the Hilltoppers compiled an overall record of 5–4 with a mark of 2–3 in conference play, placing sixth in the OVC.

Schedule

References

Western Kentucky
Western Kentucky Hilltoppers football seasons
Western Kentucky Hilltoppers football